Gangan Football Club is a football club from Kindia in the West African, state of Guinea. They play in the Guinée Championnat National, which is the second highest league in Guinean football.

History
In 1963 when the club was called Sily Club de Kindia the team has won the Guinée Coupe Nationale. The team was renamed Gangan Football Club in 2005.

Honours
Guinée Coupe Nationale: 1
Winners: 1963

Performance in CAF competitions
African Cup of Champions Clubs: 1 appearance
1964 – Second Round

References

External links
Team profile – WildStat
Team profile – calciopedia.org

Football clubs in Guinea
1963 establishments in Guinea